Hartola Church is a church building in Hartola, Finland.

Construction began in 1911, and the church was opened on 16 December 1913. The architect was Josef Stenbäck.

See also 
 Pertunmaa Church

References

External links

Official website 

Lutheran churches in Finland
Churches completed in 1913
1913 establishments in Finland